In accounting, amortization refers to expensing the acquisition cost minus the residual value of intangible assets in a systematic manner over their estimated "useful economic lives" so as to reflect their consumption, expiry, and obsolescence, or other decline in value as a result of use or the passage of time. The term amortization can also refer to the completion of that process, as in "the amortization of the tower was expected in 1734".

Depreciation is a corresponding concept for tangible assets.  Methodologies for allocating amortization to each accounting period are generally the same as these for depreciation.  However, many intangible assets such as goodwill or certain brands may be deemed to have an indefinite useful life and are therefore not subject to amortization (although goodwill is subjected to an impairment test every year).

While theoretically amortization is used to account for the decreasing value of an intangible asset over its useful life, in practice many companies will amortize what would otherwise be one-time expenses through listing them as a capital expense on the cash flow statement and paying off the cost through amortization, having the effect of improving the company's net income in the fiscal year or quarter of the expense.

Amortization is recorded in the financial statements of an entity as a reduction in the carrying value of the intangible asset in the balance sheet and as an expense in the income statement.

Under International Financial Reporting Standards, guidance on accounting for the amortization of intangible assets is contained in IAS 38. Under United States generally accepted accounting principles (GAAP), the primary guidance is contained in FAS 142.

See also

Amortized analysis
Annuity (finance theory)
Depletion (accounting)
Earnings before interest, taxes, depreciation and amortization EBITDA
Index of real estate articles

References

Accounting terminology
Real estate
Loans
Intangible assets